Rossvale is a rural locality in the Toowoomba Region, Queensland, Australia.

History 
Rossvale Provisional School opened on 24 April 1899. On 1 January 1909, it became Rossvale State School. It closed on 31 December 1985. It was at 48 Rossvale Road West.

In July 1929, at the Lutheran church in neighbouring Springside, a dispute arose over whether services should be held in German or English, resulting in a split in the congregation. Those wanting English services were prevented from using the church at Springside and decided to establish their own Bethlehem Lutheran church in Rossvale on land donated by William Kelly. A stump-capping ceremony was held on Sunday 25 August 1929. Ross Park (also written as Rosspark) Lutheran Church was opened on Sunday 29 September 1929. It was built at a cost of £340. The church closed in 1966 and was subsequently demolished. The church was at 3 Rosevale Road West 

References

Further reading 

 
 

Toowoomba Region
Localities in Queensland